Quinten Ryan Crispito Timber (born 17 June 2001) is a Dutch professional footballer who plays as midfielder for Feyenoord in the Eredivisie.

Career

Ajax
Timber played in the youth academies of DVSU and Feyenoord, before he and his brother joined the Ajax Youth Academy in 2014. Since 2016 he has played for various youth teams of the Dutch national team and in 2018 won the 2018 UEFA European Under-17 Championship. On 15 October 2018 he made his professional debut, playing for Jong Ajax, the reserves team of Ajax competing in the Eerste Divisie, the 2nd-tier of professional football in the Netherlands, in a 2–1 away loss to Jong PSV. He scored his first goal on 25 March 2019 in a 3–3 draw with Jong FC Utrecht.

Utrecht
On 5 May 2021, it was announced, that Timber would transfer to FC Utrecht, signing a 3-year contract with the club from his hometown.

Feyenoord
On 28 July 2022, Feyenoord announced that it had signed Timber on a 4-year contract, with FC Utrecht announcing that Timber became the most expensive outgoing player in the club's history to date. The transfer fee is said to be €8.5 million. He scored his first goal for the club on 27 August 2022, scoring the first goal in a 4–0 win over FC Emmen.

Personal life
Born in the Netherlands, Timber and his twin brother Jurriën Timber, who is also a footballer, are of Aruban and Curaçaoan descent. Their mother Marilyn is from Aruba and their father is from Curaçao, both parts of the ABC Islands in the Dutch Caribbean. Due to situations in the past, the family took on their maternal name Timber instead of taking the last name of their father Maduro. The twins also have three older brothers Shamier, Chris, and Dylan.

Honours
Ajax
 KNVB Cup: 2020–21

Netherlands U17
 UEFA European Under-17 Championship: 2018

Individual
 FC Utrecht Player of the Year (David Di Tommaso Trophy): 2022

References

2001 births
Living people
Footballers from Utrecht (city)
Dutch twins
Identical twins
Twin sportspeople
Dutch footballers
Netherlands youth international footballers
Dutch people of Aruban descent
Dutch people of Curaçao descent
Association football midfielders
AFC Ajax players
Jong Ajax players
FC Utrecht players
Eredivisie players
Eerste Divisie players